Xylopia lamarckii is a species of plant in the Annonaceae family. It is endemic to Mauritius.  It is threatened by habitat loss.

References

lamarckii
Endemic flora of Mauritius
Critically endangered plants
Taxa named by Henri Ernest Baillon
Taxonomy articles created by Polbot